Kim Dong-hee may refer to:
 Kim Dong-hee (Go player) (born 1985), professional Go player
 Kim Dong-hee (footballer) (born 1989), South Korean footballer
 Kim Dong-hee (actor) (born 1999), South Korean actor